Novyye Bishindy (Yañı Bişende) is a rural locality (a selo) in Verkhnebishindinsky Selsoviet, Tuymazinsky District, Bashkortostan, Russia. The population was 274 as of 2010. There are 3 streets.

Geography 
Novyye Bishindy is located 19 km south of Tuymazy (the district's administrative centre) by road. Verkhniye Bishindy is the nearest rural locality.

References 

Rural localities in Tuymazinsky District